Parikshit Valsangkar (born 24 February 1995) is an Indian cricketer. He made his Twenty20 debut for Mumbai in the 2017–18 Zonal T20 League on 7 January 2018. He made his List A debut on 14 December 2021, for Mumbai in the 2021–22 Vijay Hazare Trophy.

References

External links
 

1995 births
Living people
Indian cricketers
Mumbai cricketers
Place of birth missing (living people)